The women's downhill competition of the Sochi 2014 Olympics was held at the Rosa Khutor Alpine Resort near Krasnaya Polyana, Russia, on Wednesday, 12 February. The race was won by Tina Maze of Slovenia and Dominique Gisin of Switzerland, who posted the same time. Lara Gut, also of Switzerland, was a tenth of a second back and took the bronze medal.

Summary
Fabienne Suter was the first out of the gate and led until Gisin surpassed her by 0.37 seconds. Immediately after Gisin, Daniela Merighetti took a provisional second position, and stayed there until Gut, skiing 18th, replaced her at 0.10 seconds behind Gisin. Maze was the 21st racer out of the gate and led at all the intervals, but finished with exactly the same time as Gisin. The best run after Maze was by Lotte Smiseth Sejersted of Norway, who finished sixth.

Defending Olympic champion Lindsey Vonn did not participate due to a knee injury, and the other defending medalists, Julia Mancuso and Elisabeth Görgl, finished outside the podium. It was the first time any Olympic alpine event has ended in a tie for the gold. Maze also won the first-ever gold medal for Slovenia at the Winter Olympics (since 1992), while Gisin and Gut both won their first Olympic medals.

Results
Wednesday, 12 February 2014

The race was started at 11:00 local time, (UTC+4). Six racers did not finish; Tina Weirather did not start due to a season-ending injury during a training run on the course.

References

External links
FIS-Ski.com – 2014 Winter Olympics – Women's Downhill

Downhill